Columbus Academy (CA) is a selective, independent college-preparatory school for students from pre-kindergarten to twelfth grade. The school is located on a large, secluded campus surrounded by wooded areas in Gahanna, Ohio in the United States, 8 miles from downtown Columbus. The Academy was founded in 1911 by J. L. Hamill in Bexley, Ohio and moved to its current campus in 1968. Originally an all-boys school, it became coeducational in 1991 when the Board of Trustees decided to admit girls. From its conception, the school expanded over time to a matriculation level of 1,000 students. Columbus Academy students and alumni often refer to the school as "Academy."

Founding and Bexley campus 

In 1911, a group of area businessmen founded the school to provide a local option for boys' secondary education. They adopted the independent country day school philosophy that academic preparation was a cooperative effort between the school and the home.

Columbus Academy's first campus was situated on  along Alum Creek. Numerous additions to the "main house" were made as the number of students in grades 5-12 grew. Academy's first headmaster, Frank P.R. Van Syckel, instituted a liberal arts program and athletic instruction.

Move to current campus 

After continued enrollment growth and repeated flooding along Alum Creek, the Board approved a 20-year plan for relocation. The school acquired  in Gahanna  (eight miles northeast of Columbus), raised funds, and built a new campus. The original five-building complex served the school well until the student body exceeded 600 boys. In the mid-'70s, the school undertook a major building program that added a lower school wing and the Schoedinger Theatre. This expansion allowed Kindergarten to be added to the school in the early 1980s. In 1991, the school became a co-educational institution.

The school is situated on a secluded suburban campus. In 1999 the school built a new library reminiscent of its old Bexley campus, and added large additions to the theatre and Lower and Upper schools in 2004. Beginning in 2003, they added another addition, respectably larger than the last. This addition consisted of a new athletic building, new sports facilities and courts, additional parking lots, a new upper school wing, and a third library (totaling three libraries: one lower school, one middle school, and one upper school).

In the 2014 - 2015 school year, a ropes course and new playground was added to the Columbus Academy campus.

Athletics
The Academy was one of the first schools in the US to field a soccer team and track team. Today, Academy students compete interscholastically and intramurally in football, soccer, track, baseball, basketball, tennis, golf, lacrosse, wrestling, field hockey, swimming, cross country, and other sports.

Ohio High School Athletic Association Team State championships

 Baseball - 1982
 American Football – 1987, 2003
 Boys Soccer – 1995
 Boys Golf – 1983, 1991, 1995, 1997, 1998, 1999, 2014, 2017, 2018, 2019, 2020, 2021
 Girls Golf - 2022
 Boys Track and Field – 1977, 1981, 2012, 2013
 Girls Field Hockey – 1994, 1997, 1999, 2000, 2001, 2003, 2004, 2006, 2012, 2013, 2018, 2019

Other non-OHSAA titles
 Boys Tennis - 2008, 2009, 2010
 Girls Tennis - 2008
 Girls Lacrosse - 1998, 2000, 2011, 2015

Accreditation & memberships 

 National Association of Independent Schools
 Independent Schools Association of the Central States
 Ohio Association of Independent Schools
 Recipient of Malone Family Foundation Award

Notable alumni
Morgan Harper - American lawyer and activist
Martin Nesbitt - businessman, founder and chief executive officer of The Parking Spot, close personal friend of U. S. President Barack Obama
Todd Park - Chief Technology Officer of the United States, former CTO of the Department of Health and Human Services, co-founder of athenahealth.
Andrew Romanoff - politician, former Speaker of the Colorado House of Representatives

Notable people
Jeffrey Sutton - former history teacher and soccer coach; judge for the U.S. Court of Appeals for the Sixth Circuit

External links 
Columbus Academy web site
National Association of Independent Schools

References

Preparatory schools in Ohio
Educational institutions established in 1911
Gahanna, Ohio
High schools in Franklin County, Ohio
Private high schools in Ohio
Private middle schools in Ohio
Private elementary schools in Ohio
1911 establishments in Ohio